Alburnoides devolli is a species of small (9.5 cm max length) freshwater fish in the family Cyprinidae. It is endemic to the Devoll River in Albania. This species is present only in the upper stream of the Devolli River, due to the geological isolation of its habitat. Various morphological differences such as anal and dorsal fins, distinguish Alburnoides devolli from other Alburnoides species that inhabit Lake Prespa, Lake Skadar or Danube River.

References 

Alburnoides
Freshwater fish of Europe
Endemic fauna of Albania
Fish described in 2010